Meade County (standard abbreviation: ME) is a county located in the U.S. state of Kansas. As of the 2020 census, the county population was 4,055. The largest city and county seat is Meade. The county was created in 1873 and named in honor of General George G. Meade.

Geography

Adjacent counties
 Gray County (north)
 Ford County (northeast)
 Clark County (east)
 Beaver County, Oklahoma (south)
 Seward County (west)
 Haskell County (northwest)

Demographics

As of the census of 2000, there were 4,631 people, 1,728 households, and 1,252 families residing in the county.  The population density was 5 people per square mile (2/km2).  There were 1,968 housing units at an average density of 2 per square mile (1/km2).  The racial makeup of the county was 91.10% White, 0.39% Black or African American, 0.54% Native American, 0.22% Asian, 6.24% from other races, and 1.51% from two or more races.  10.90% of the population were Hispanic or Latino of any race.

There were 1,728 households, out of which 36.40% had children under the age of 18 living with them, 64.70% were married couples living together, 4.90% had a female householder with no husband present, and 27.50% were non-families. 25.60% of all households were made up of individuals, and 13.60% had someone living alone who was 65 years of age or older.  The average household size was 2.61 and the average family size was 3.16.

In the county, the population was spread out, with 29.50% under the age of 18, 6.90% from 18 to 24, 26.50% from 25 to 44, 19.20% from 45 to 64, and 17.90% who were 65 years of age or older.  The median age was 36 years. For every 100 females there were 98.20 males.  For every 100 females age 18 and over, there were 95.00 males.

The median income for a household in the county was $36,761, and the median income for a family was $41,550. Males had a median income of $29,295 versus $20,153 for females. The per capita income for the county was $16,824.  About 6.70% of families and 9.30% of the population were below the poverty line, including 11.90% of those under age 18 and 5.70% of those age 65 or over.

Government
Meade County is usually carried by Republican candidates. The last time a Democratic presidential candidate carried the county was in 1936, when Franklin D. Roosevelt won a landslide victory nationwide.

Presidential elections

Laws
The Kansas Constitution was amended in 1986 to allow the sale of alcoholic liquor by the individual drink with the approval of voters, either with or without a minimum of 30% of sales coming from food. Meade County is one of 67 counties in the state that allows for the sale of liquor by the drink with the minimum food sales stipulation.

Education

Unified school districts
 Fowler USD 225
 Meade USD 226

Communities

Cities
 Fowler
 Meade (county seat) 
 Plains

Unincorporated community
 Missler

Townships
Meade County is divided into nine townships.  None of the cities within the county are considered governmentally independent, and all figures for the townships include those of the cities.  In the following table, the population center is the largest city (or cities) included in that township's population total, if it is of a significant size.

See also
 Dry counties
 National Register of Historic Places listings in Meade County, Kansas

References

Notes

Further reading

 A History of Meade County, Kansas; Frank Sullivan; 184 pages; 1916.
 Plat Book of Meade County, Kansas; R. P. Ice Co; 43 pages; 1909.

External links

County
 
 Meade County - Directory of Public Officials
Historical
 Meade County History
Maps
 Meade County maps: Current, Historic, KDOT
 Kansas Highway maps: Current, Historic, KDOT
 Kansas Railroad maps: Current, 1996, 1915, KDOT and Kansas Historical Society

 
Kansas counties
1873 establishments in Kansas
Populated places established in 1873